Montserrat competed in their third Commonwealth Games in 2002. Only one athlete, Gavin Lee, took part; he competed in the Men's High Jump and jumped 1.95 meters, finishing 16th.

See also
2002 Commonwealth Games results

References

2002
2002 in Montserrat
Nations at the 2002 Commonwealth Games